David Kenneth Schenker (born 1968) is an American diplomat who worked in the Department of Defense during the George W. Bush administration, and was nominated on April 9, 2018, to head the Bureau of Near Eastern Affairs in the State Department.

Early life

Schenker was born in 1968 to mother Linda and father Michael Schenker, both Jewish. He grew up in Ridgewood, New Jersey, graduating from Ridgewood High School in 1986. Schenker earned a B.A. at the University of Vermont in 1990, then an M.A. at the University of Michigan and Certificate, Center for Arabic Study Abroad (CASA), at the American University in Cairo.

Schenker has spent most of his career at the Washington Institute for Near East Policy, starting as an analyst after graduate school.

In 2002, Schenker temporarily left the Washington Institute to be Levant (Syria, Lebanon, Jordan and Israel) country director in the Bush Defense Department under Secretary Donald Rumsfeld. Schenker returned to the Washington Institute in 2006 and has been there since. At the time of his nomination to the State Department, Schenker was director of the institute's Program on Arab Politics.

Schenker is a prolific writer, often on Hezbollah in Lebanon and about Syria. He has written two books, Dancing with Saddam: The Strategic Tango of Jordanian–Iraqi Relations (2003) and Palestinian Democracy and Governance: An Appraisal of the Legislative Council (2000).

References

External links
 Who Is David Schenker, the newest Trump appointee for Middle East policy?
 Situation in Iraq 
 Offer for Information on Hizballah’s Financial Networks Muhammad Kawtharani

1968 births
Living people
United States Assistant Secretaries of State
Assistant Secretaries of State for the Near East and North Africa
United States Foreign Service personnel
People from Ridgewood, New Jersey
Ridgewood High School (New Jersey) alumni
University of Vermont alumni
University of Michigan alumni
The American University in Cairo alumni